Lúcia Leila José Moçambique (born 22 December 1993), known as Lúcia Leila, is a Mozambican footballer who plays as a defender for the Mozambique women's national team.

Club career
Lúcia Leila has played for Atlético Ouriense in Portugal.

International career
Lúcia Leila capped for Mozambique at senior level during four COSAFA Women's Championship editions (2017, 2018, 2019 and 2021).

References

External links

1993 births
Living people
Mozambican women's footballers
Women's association football defenders
Atlético Ouriense players
Mozambique women's international footballers
Mozambican expatriate footballers
Mozambican expatriate sportspeople in Portugal
Expatriate women's footballers in Portugal